Alton Bay Seaplane Base  is a state-owned, public-use seaplane base located in a cove of Lake Winnipesaukee. The base is two nautical miles (4 km) north of the central business district of Alton Bay, in Belknap County, New Hampshire, United States.

Facilities and aircraft 
Alton Bay Seaplane Base has one seaplane landing area designated 1/19 and measuring 2,600 x 100 feet (792 x 30 m). For the 12-month period ending 31 December 2011, the airport had 600 general aviation aircraft operations, an average of 50 per month.

During the winter months, the base may seasonally open an ice runway instead of the normal seaplane landing area. This is the only FAA approved ice runway in the contiguous United States. 
The earliest the ice runway has opened is January 10. It is required to close no later than March 15.

References

External links 

Airports in New Hampshire
Seaplane bases in the United States
Transportation buildings and structures in Belknap County, New Hampshire
Alton, New Hampshire